William Thomas Hickey (20 February 1880 – 15 March 1969) was a former Australian rules footballer who played with South Melbourne and Carlton in the Victorian Football League (VFL).

Notes

References
 South Melbourne Team, Melbourne Punch, (Thursday, 4 June 1903), p.16.

External links 

	
Bill Hickey's profile at Blueseum
Bill Hickey’s Profile at On Reflection
1903 - South Melbourne FC team photo

Australian rules footballers from Victoria (Australia)
Sydney Swans players
Carlton Football Club players
1880 births
1969 deaths